Nicholas John Young is a British mathematician working in operator theory,  functional analysis and several complex variables. He is a research professor at the University of Leeds. Much of his work has been about the interaction of operator theory and function theory.

Publications 
Young has written more than a hundred papers, over 30  of them in collaboration with Jim Agler. He is the author of the book An Introduction to Hilbert Space.

His Ph.D. adviser was Vlastimil Pták, and he has had 5 Ph.D. students.

References 

1943 births
Living people
Academics of the University of Leeds
Hilbert space
Operator theorists
20th-century British mathematicians
Alumni of the University of Oxford